This is a complete list of the operas of the Italian composer Baldassare Galuppi (1706–1785).

List

Doubtful
Bertoldo, Bertoldino e Cacasenno, Venice, Teatro San Moisè, 27 December 1748
La mascherata, dramma comico in 3 acts, libretto by Carlo Goldoni, Venice, Teatro San Cassiano, 26 December 1750 (probably in part or all by Gioacchino Cocchi)
La finta cameriera, dramma giocoso in 3 acts, libretto by Giovanni Gualberto Barlocci, Brunswick, 1751
Astianatte, 1755
Alceste
La fausse coquette

Revisions and additions
Siroe re di Persia (after Leonardo Vinci), opera seria in 3 acts, libretto by Pietro Metastasio), Venice, Teatro Grimani di San Giovanni Grisostomo, Carnival 1731 (in collaboration with Giovanni Battista Pescetti
Alessandro in Persia, 1741
L'ambizione delusa (after Rinaldo di Capua), dramma giocoso in 3 acts, libretto by Francesco Vanneschi after La commedia in commedia by Cosimo Antonio Pelli, Venice, Teatro San Cassiano, Autumn 1744
Madama Ciana (after Gaetano Latilla), dramma giocoso in 3 acts, libretto by Giovanni Gualberto Barlocci (or Cosimo Antonio Pelli), Venice, Teatro San Cassiano, probably Autumn 1744
La libertà nociva (after Rinaldo di Capua), dramma giocoso in 3 acts, libretto by Giovanni Gualberto Barlocci, Venice, Teatro San Cassiano, 22 November 1744
Antigono, 1746
Il protettore alla moda (after Chi non fa non falla by an anonymous composer), dramma giocoso in 3 acts, libretto by Giuseppe Maria Buini, Venice, Teatro San Cassiano, Autumn 1749
Il villano geloso, 1769

Sources

Lists of operas by composer